The Richest Girl in the World is a 1958 Danish comedy film directed by Lau Lauritzen Jr. and Alice O'Fredericks. It marked the film debut of the already popular singing duo Nina & Frederik, with Nina as the title character, and Frederik as the handsome but poor calypso singer she falls in love with.

Plot summary

Cast
 Poul Reichhardt as John
 Nina Van Pallandt as Lisa Hoffman
 Frederik van Pallandt as Jacques
 Birgitte Bruun as Judy
 Gunnar Lauring as Onkel Toby
 Jessie Rindom as Clara
 Jeanne Darville as Elisabeth
 Asbjørn Andersen as Hoffmann
 Else-Marie as Frk. Bartholin
 Paul Hagen as Journalist Lund
 Johannes Marott as Pressefotograf Smith
 Christa Rasmusen as Johns sekretær
 Christa Rasmussen as Johns sekretær
 Judy Gringer as Omstillingsdame

References

External links
 

1958 films
Danish comedy films
1950s Danish-language films
1958 comedy films
Films directed by Lau Lauritzen Jr.
Films directed by Alice O'Fredericks
Films scored by Sven Gyldmark